Tandang Sora Avenue, formerly known as Banlat Road, is a major east-west thoroughfare bisecting Quezon City in Metro Manila, the Philippines.

The avenue's segment east of Commonwealth Avenue is a national secondary road with the route designation N129; it also forms part of the Circumferential Road 5 (C-5) network of the Metro Manila arterial road system. Its western segment in Tandang Sora and Culiat west of Commonwealth Avenue is a narrow municipal road classified as a national tertiary road.

 
Tandang Sora Avenue was named after its location in the barangay of Tandang Sora. The barrio, in turn, was renamed from Talipapa in 1952 in honor of Filipina patriot Melchora Aquino.

A flyover linking Tandang Sora Avenue with Luzon Avenue over Commonwealth Avenue in Culiat was built in 2009 as part of the C-5 Road network project. In February 2019, the Department of Public Works and Highways announced the demolition of a flyover of Commonwealth Avenue at the Tandang Sora junction in New Era to make way for the construction of the Tandang Sora station of the Manila Metro Rail Transit System Line 7 (MRT-7). A Metro Manila Subway station is also planned at the avenue's junction with Mindanao Avenue in Tandang Sora.

Intersections

References

Streets in Quezon City